Liverpool Football Club is an English association football club based in Liverpool, Merseyside. The club was formed in 1892 following a disagreement between the board of Everton and club president John Houlding, who owned the club's ground, Anfield. The disagreement between the two parties over rent resulted in Everton moving to Goodison Park from Anfield, which left Houlding with no tenant. Thus, he founded Liverpool F.C. to play in the empty stadium. Liverpool won the First Division title for the first time in 1901; since then, the club has won a further 18 league titles, along with eight FA Cups and nine Football League Cups. They have also been crowned champions of European football on six occasions by winning the European Cup/UEFA Champions League in 1977, 1978, 1981, 1984, 2005 and 2019. The club was one of 22 members of the Premier League when it was formed in 1992.

Liverpool have had 21 full-time managers. Kenny Dalglish is the only person to have managed the club on two occasions. He first managed Liverpool from 1985 to February 1991, and then from January 2011 to July 2012. The most successful person to manage Liverpool is Bob Paisley, who won six Football League titles, six Charity Shields, three Football League Cups, three European Cups, one UEFA Super Cup and one UEFA Cup in his nine-year reign as manager. The club's longest-serving manager was Tom Watson, who managed the club from 1896 to 1915, totalling 19 years.

This chronological list comprises all those who have held the position of manager of the first team of Liverpool since their foundation in 1892. Each manager's entry includes his dates of tenure and the club's overall competitive record (in terms of matches won, drawn and lost), honours won and significant achievements while under his care. Caretaker managers are included, where known, as well as those who have been in permanent charge.

Managerial history

1892–1959

The first Liverpool managers, William Edward Barclay and John McKenna, were appointed in 1892. Barclay acted as secretary-manager, overseeing the administrative side of the club, while McKenna took charge of matters on the field. The two worked in tandem as Liverpool won promotion from the Lancashire League in the club's first season. However, in 1896, McKenna appointed Tom Watson as manager. He went on to win two Football League championships. As the First World War broke out, Watson was embarking on his nineteenth season in charge at Anfield. It was to be his last, because he died in May 1915, aged 56. David Ashworth was appointed manager when football resumed after the War. Ashworth won one league title, but left for Oldham Athletic soon after this. He was replaced in February 1923 by a Liverpool director, Matt McQueen, who won one league title for the club. However, this marked the beginning of a barren spell spanning more than 20 years before Liverpool finally regained the title in 1947 under the stewardship of George Kay. Kay also led Liverpool to the FA Cup Final in 1950, but lost the game 2–0 to Arsenal. He retired the following year, owing to ill-health. The next manager, Don Welsh became the first Liverpool manager to be sacked after leading the club to relegation in 1954. His successor, Phil Taylor, also failed to win a trophy or gain promotion back to the top flight during his reign as boss.

1959–1991
On 1 December 1959, Bill Shankly was appointed manager, beginning a fifteen-year spell as manager that brought three league titles, two FA Cups and a first European trophy, the UEFA Cup, to Anfield. Shankly's reign as manager is famous for the establishment of the Anfield boot room as the location for his tactical discussions with his coaches. When he was not managing the club, Shankly was usually at his typewriter, personally replying to the letters which arrived at Melwood. Shankly even called some supporters at home to discuss the previous day's game, while the accounts of him providing tickets for fans are endless. When Shankly retired in 1974, he was replaced by his assistant, Bob Paisley. During the next nine seasons, Paisley proceeded to win six league titles and three European Cups to become the most successful manager in the history of the club. When Paisley retired in 1983, his assistant Joe Fagan took over, and continued the Boot Room tradition, and winning a treble of League, European Cup and League Cup in his first season. He again guided Liverpool to a European Cup Final, but the match was overshadowed by the Heysel Stadium disaster, and he retired soon after. Striker Kenny Dalglish was then made the club's first player-manager and in his first season in charge, Dalglish led the club to a League and FA Cup double. After that great first season, Dalglish led Liverpool to a further two league titles and another FA Cup. However, the Hillsborough disaster overshadowed his reign; it was one of the reasons for Dalglish resigning on 22 February 1991.

1991–present
First-team coach Ronnie Moran took charge of team affairs for several weeks before Graeme Souness was named as Dalglish's successor. Under Souness, Liverpool won the FA Cup in 1992, but nothing else. He made way for Roy Evans, who also won just one trophy, the League Cup, before Gérard Houllier was appointed joint manager with Evans in 1998. This arrangement lasted only 18 games before Evans resigned, leaving Houllier—Liverpool's first non-British manager—in sole charge. Houllier won nothing until a treble in 2001, consisting of the FA Cup, League Cup and UEFA Cup. Houllier underwent major heart surgery during the 2001–02 season, but the squad was unaffected and managed to hold on to a second-place finish. Although Phil Thompson stepped in as temporary manager while Houllier was recovering from heart surgery, the matches played under Thompson are included in Houllier's record. Another League Cup was won in 2003, but this was to be Houllier's last trophy as Liverpool manager as he and the club parted by mutual consent at the end of the 2003–04 season, to be replaced by Valencia manager, Rafael Benítez.

In Benítez's first season in charge, Liverpool reached the UEFA Champions League Final, where they beat A.C. Milan on penalties, after the match finished 3–3 after extra time. The following season, Liverpool reached the FA Cup Final, where they beat West Ham United, again on penalties after a 3–3 draw. Benítez again guided Liverpool to a Champions League Final in 2007, but this time A.C. Milan beat them 2–1. On 3 June 2010, Benitez paid the price for a disappointing 2009–10 season when Liverpool announced he had left the club by mutual consent after six years in charge. Benitez, who was one year into a five-year contract, finalised his departure after agreeing a severance payment. Benitez's assistant Sammy Lee took over the reins at Liverpool until Managing director Christian Purslow and former manager Kenny Dalglish found a replacement. On 1 July 2010, former Fulham boss Roy Hodgson was confirmed as the new manager. After a poor tenure, which included Liverpool being 18th after 6 games, and only one away win during Hodgson's time in charge, Hodgson was sacked on 8 January 2011 and was replaced by former manager Kenny Dalglish the day before a 3rd Round FA Cup game against Manchester United. Dalglish signed a three-year contract as permanent manager in May, but was sacked a year later. Although the 2011–12 season ended with a poor 8th-place finish in the Premier League, Dalglish guided Liverpool to two Cup finals at Wembley, ending a six-year trophy drought by winning the League Cup. The second Cup final appearance was the FA Cup, which Liverpool lost to Chelsea. He was replaced by Brendan Rodgers on 1 June 2012.

Rodgers led them in the 2013–14 season to a surprise title challenge, however Liverpool ended the league season in second place, despite scoring 101 goals, the club's most since the 1895–96 season and the third-highest in Premier League history. Rodgers was the first Liverpool manager to win the LMA Manager of The Year Award. However, he was the first manager of the club not to win a major trophy in his first three years at the helm, and on 4 October 2015, he was sacked. On 8 October, he was replaced by former Borussia Dortmund manager Jürgen Klopp. Klopp made an instant impact on the club and guided them to a League Cup Final and a surprise Europa League Final in his first season at the club. During their Europa League campaign, he beat both English rivals Manchester United and his former club Borussia Dortmund en route to the final. However, they lost the League Cup Final to Manchester City via penalty shoot-out and they lost 1–3 to Spanish side Sevilla in the Europa League Final. They also finished 8th in the league, meaning they wouldn't qualify for European competition for the 2016–17 season. On 8 June 2016, Klopp and his coaching staff signed six-year contract extensions that ran until 2022. Klopp guided the club to a fourth-place finish in the 2016–17 season, qualifying them for the 2017–18 UEFA Champions League qualifying play-offs, where they beat German club, TSG 1899 Hoffenheim 6–3 on aggregate in a two-legged play-off to reach the group stage. Klopp led to the team to finish top of their group and beat eventual English champions, Manchester City, and Italian club Roma in the knockout phase en route to the 2018 UEFA Champions League Final. Unfortunately for Liverpool, they lost 1–3 to Spanish giants Real Madrid. During the 2018–19 season, Klopp guided Liverpool to their sixth Champions League triumph with a 2–0 win over fellow English club, Tottenham Hotspur, and also guided the club to a second-place finish in the league. At the start of the 2019–20 season, Klopp's Liverpool side played against Manchester City in the FA Community Shield and against Chelsea in the UEFA Super Cup. Both matches went into penalty shoot-outs, with Liverpool losing the former and winning the latter. Later in December, Klopp also guided Liverpool to their first ever FIFA club World Cup trophy, making it 3 trophies in 2019. In the 2019–20 season, Klopp secured Liverpool's first Premier League title and first top flight title since 1990 by finishing on the most points in their history (99 points). The season was notable both for Liverpool's huge points lead over the rest of the league and for its interruption by the Coronavirus shutdown, meaning Liverpool won the Premier league at both the earliest (7 games to go) and the latest time (June) ever.

Key 

Key to record:
Pld = Matches played
W = Matches won
D = Matches drawn
L = Matches lost
GF = Goals for / scored
GA = Goals against / conceded
Win % = Win ratio

Key to honours:
L1 = Football League First Division/Premier League
L2 = Football League Second Division/Lancashire League
FA = FA Cup
LC = Football League Cup
CS = FA Community Shield
EC = European Cup/UEFA Champions League
UC = UEFA Cup
US = UEFA Super Cup
WC = Intercontinental Cup/FIFA Club World Cup

Managers
Information correct . Only competitive matches are counted.

Notes

References
General

Specific

Bibliography

 
Managers
Liverpool